William Dawson Gunter Jr. (born July 16, 1934) is an American politician from the state of Florida.

Early life and education
Gunter was born in Jacksonville in 1934. He attended public schools in Live Oak and received his Bachelor of Science in Agriculture (B.S.A.) from the University of Florida in 1956. While a student at Florida, he was a member of the Sigma Alpha Epsilon Fraternity (Florida Upsilon chapter).  Gunter briefly attended the University of Georgia in 1957 and served in the United States Army from 1957 to 1958.

Political career
He was a member of the Florida State Senate in 1966. He was elected as a Democrat to the United States House of Representatives as the first member from Florida's 5th congressional district, a newly created district in the Orlando area, in the 1972 election. He only served a single term. His voting record in the 93rd Congress was generally moderate.

Senate campaigns
Gunter unsuccessfully sought the Democratic nomination for the U.S. Senate in 1974, but lost the primary to Richard Bernard Stone. He was elected Florida State Treasurer and Insurance Commissioner in 1976 and served in this post until 1988.

In 1980, Gunter ran again for the U.S. Senate, defeating incumbent Senator Stone in the Democratic primary. He then faced the Republican nominee Paula Hawkins, who had been the Republican nominee for lieutenant governor in the 1978 gubernatorial election. Gunter lost to Hawkins, who won 51.7 percent of the vote to Gunter's 48.3 percent. Gunter's loss was one of twelve Republican pickups in 1980, which produced a Republican majority in the Senate for the first time since 1954.

Gunter made a final U.S. Senate bid in 1988, narrowly losing the Democratic nomination to Buddy MacKay, who went on to lose the general election to Connie Mack III.

Post-politics
In recent years, Gunter has worked at Rogers, Gunter, Vaughn, a Tallahassee-based insurance agency and been active in related trade associations and lobbying for the industry.

References

External links

|-

|-

Democratic Party Florida state senators
University of Florida College of Agricultural and Life Sciences alumni
1934 births
Democratic Party members of the United States House of Representatives from Florida
Living people
State Treasurers of Florida
State insurance commissioners of the United States